The Superior Cadet Decoration Award is the second highest Department of the Army medal awarded exclusively to Reserve Officers' Training Corps cadets. This award is presented annually to the outstanding cadet in each year of Military Science at each of the respective ROTC units. As with other Department of the Army decorations, the award consists of a medal, ribbon, and lapel button with case, accompanied by DA Form 1773 ("Citation for the Superior Cadet Decoration Award") signed by the regimental commander on behalf of the Secretary of the Army. In the Army, this award is also known as the Superior Cadet Decoration and the Superior Cadet Medal.

Criteria for award
To be awarded this decoration, a cadet must:
Be a regularly enrolled ROTC cadet (MS IV cadets scheduled for midyear graduation will be considered)
Be in the top 25% in ROTC and academic standing
Demonstrate officer potential

Design
The medal consists of a lamp, a sword, and a book. The lamp denotes the pursuit of knowledge, higher learning, and partnership of Army
ROTC with American colleges and universities. The sword signifies the courage, gallantry, and self-sacrifice intrinsic to the profession of arms. On the reverse is inscribed: "Superior Cadet."

Superior Junior Cadet Decoration Award

There is also a Superior Junior Cadet Decoration Award with similar requirements issued to cadets in the Junior Reserve Officers' Training Corps and National Defense Cadet Corps. For the JROTC version, the only difference in appearance of the two awards is an inverse of the red and blue colors on the ribbon portion of the medal. Again for the NDCC version, the only design difference is the ribbon portion of the medal. Overlaying a gray background, there is a total of ten vertical red stripes, with five stripes on the left side and five stripes on the right side.

To be considered eligible for this award, an individual must be:
A Junior ROTC or NDCC cadet
In the top 10 percent of his or her class in Junior ROTC or NDCC academically and in the top 50 percent of his or her class in overall academic standing
Recommended by the Senior Army Instructor and principal or head of the appropriate institution

See also 

Awards and decorations of the United States army
Awards and decorations of the United States military
List of military decorations

References

Awards and decorations of the United States Army
Reserve Officers' Training Corps